Olympic Sports Center is a transfer station of Line 6 and Line 7 of the Hangzhou Metro in China. It was opened on 30 December 2020, together with the Line 6 and Line 7. It is located in the Binjiang District of Hangzhou, near the Hangzhou Sports Park Stadium which will be the main venue of 2022 Asian Games.

Gallery

References 

Railway stations in Zhejiang
Railway stations in China opened in 2020
Hangzhou Metro stations